U.S. Army Field Manual 30-31B is a document claiming to be a classified appendix to a U.S. Army Field Manual that describes top secret counterinsurgency tactics. In particular, it identifies a "strategy of tension" involving violent attacks which are then blamed on radical left-wing groups in order to convince allied governments of the need for counter-action. It has been called the Westmoreland Field Manual because it is signed with the alleged signature of General William Westmoreland. It was labelled as supplement B (hence "30-31B"), although the publicly released version of FM30-31 only has one appendix, Supplement A.

History 
The first mention of the document was in the Turkish newspaper Barış (sometimes anglicized to Barish), in 1975.

A facsimile copy of FM30-31B then appeared a year later in Bangkok, Thailand, and in various capitals of north African states. In 1978, it appeared in various European magazines, including the Spanish Triunfo and El Pais. The Italian press picked up the Triunfo publication, and a copy was published in the October 1978 issue of L'Europeo.

A wide range of field manuals, including 30–31, can be accessed through websites that catalog U.S. field manuals. However, 30-31B is not among the field manuals published by the military.

The "Westmoreland Field Manual" was mentioned in at least two parliamentary commissions reports of European countries, one about the Italian Propaganda Due masonic lodge, and one about the Belgian stay-behind network. The latter says that "the commission has not any certainty about the authenticity of the document".

Authenticity
At a 1980 hearing of the House of Representatives Permanent Select Committee on Intelligence, Subcommittee of Oversight, CIA officials testified that the document was a singularly effective forgery by the KGB and an example of Soviet covert action. 

Scholars Peer Henrik Hansen and Thomas Rid, both specializing in Cold War intelligence, and the U.S. State Department claim the document is a forgery by Soviet intelligence services. The document first appeared in Turkey in the 1970s, before being circulated to other countries. It was also used at the end of the 1970s during Operation GLADIO, to implicate the Central Intelligence Agency in the Red Brigades' kidnapping and assassination of former Italian prime minister Aldo Moro.

The discovery in the early-1990s of Operation Gladio (NATO stay-behind networks) in Europe led to renewed debate as to whether or not the manual was fraudulent. In Allan Francovich's three-part BBC documentary on the subject, Licio Gelli, the Italian leader of the anti-Communist P2 freemason lodge, stated "The CIA gave it to me." In the documentary, Ray S. Cline said "I suspect that it is an authentic document", but former CIA head William Colby said "I have never heard of it.".

See also 
 Operation Northwoods
Operation Condor
CIA activities in Nicaragua
 Nicaragua v. United States
 Psychological warfare
 U.S. Army and CIA interrogation manuals
 United States involvement in regime change

References

External links 
 Belgian parliamentary report concerning the stay-behind network, partial copy of FM 30-31B on pp. 80–82.
 Joint resolution of the European Parliament on the Gladio affair, p. 16
 US Field Manual 30-31B, in German
 Internet Archive copy, in English

Forgery controversies
1975 documents
1975 hoaxes
Espionage
Cold War documents
Years of Lead (Italy)
Operation Gladio
Soviet Union–United States relations
Soviet Union intelligence operations
KGB operations
United States Army Field Manuals